Linda Andrews may refer to:

 Linda Andrews (singer) (born 1973), Danish singer
 Linda Andrews (Casualty), fictional character from Casualty
Linda Andrews (badminton), a medalist at the European Junior Badminton Championships